Pranshu Kaushal (born 26 September 1989) is an Indian actor. He is also a trained Film maker from U.S.A. He is best known for his character role as Harsh Roy in the Hindi soap Manzil Apni Apni. His debut film Hum hain teen Khurafaati is set to release on 26 September 2014.

Early life 
Pranshu was born on 26 September 1989, at Dehradun and then moved to Meerut in Uttar Pradesh. He is the only son of his parents. He did his graduation in Mass Communication from Amity university, Noida and also completed his Diploma in Film Making from the New York Film Academy, New York City, U.S.A. He is also a trained actor under the guidance of Bollywood actor Mr. K. Paintal and Mr. Raza Murad from Indian Film and Television Institute. He is a vegetarian and a fond reader of Swami Vivekananda.

Career 
 In 2012, Pranshu got his first break in the Indian Television Industry as the main lead in the serial "MANZIL APNI APNI" on DD National, which brought him into notice. This fetched him another lead role in the serial named as "Fiza" shot in 2013, for which he refined and worked on his Urdu. In August 2013, Pranshu got his first break in the Indian Film Industry as the main lead in the Hindi film "Hum hain teen Khurafaati", a comedy film, which is releasing World Wide on 26 September. His character name is Rohit in the film. Pranshu also has worked in the initial days of his career in the year 2012 in the commercial of Sonear Laminates Furniture on which he now laughs and proudly tells his story in which the face of the artists were edited. He is also working on certain Radio Features. He currently works at UPES Dehradun as a faculty of Law.

References 

1989 births
Living people
Indian male television actors
Indian filmmakers
New York Film Academy alumni